From 1910 to 1961, the Union of South Africa was a self-governing country that shared a monarch with the United Kingdom and the other Dominions of the British Empire. The monarch's constitutional roles were mostly delegated to the governor-general of the Union of South Africa.

South Africa became a republic and left the Commonwealth of Nations on 31 May 1961. On 31 May 1994, South Africa rejoined the Commonwealth as a republic, after the end of apartheid.

History
The monarchy was created by the South Africa Act 1909 which united four British colonies in Southern Africa: Cape of Good Hope, Natal, Orange River Colony and Transvaal. The act also made provisions for admitting Southern Rhodesia as a fifth province of the union in the future, but Southern Rhodesian voters rejected this option in a referendum held in 1922. South-West Africa became a League of Nations mandate of the union in 1915. Following a referendum on the subject, South Africa adopted a new constitution in 1961 which abolished the monarchy.

List of monarchs

Visits
George VI, his wife Elizabeth, and their daughters Elizabeth and Margaret, visited South Africa in 1947. 

Elizabeth II, accompanied by her husband Philip, visited South Africa in her capacity as Head of the Commonwealth, in 1995 and 1999.

See also
 State President of South Africa
 Flag of South Africa (1928–1994)
 South African Police
 House of Assembly (South Africa)
 Tricameral Parliament
 House of Representatives (South Africa)

References

Monarchies of South Africa
Monarchs of South Africa
Government of South Africa
Politics of South Africa
South Africa
Heads of state of South Africa
1961 disestablishments in South Africa
South Africa
Former monarchies of Africa
Political history of South Africa